The Young Turks was a splinter group of politicians in the United States within the Republican Party during the early 1960s. The group, mostly consisting of Congressmen who had become disenchanted with the course of the Republican Party, worked within the system to appoint their fellow members into leadership roles, so they could take control of the party. They were considered "rebels" by the traditional Republicans. Gerald Ford, who would become President of the United States, rose to prominence as a Young Turk.

Etymology
There has been no special meaning given or discussed for the group's choice of the name "Young Turks" in any of the biographical collections of the members. The dictionary definition states, "an insurgent or a member of an insurgent group especially in a political party...one advocating changes within a usually established group".. On the other hand, Young Turks term refers to a group of intellectual Turks in 19th Century Ottoman Empire, who were in opposition to Sultan Abdulhamid II.

Formation
The group began in the early 1960s as a loose network of younger Republican congressmen. According to an article that appeared in New York Magazine in 1975, Charles E. Goodell of New York and Robert P. Griffin of Michigan got together in January 1963 and came up with a plan to supplant one of the elder statesmen, Charles Hoeven, who was Chairman of the House Republican Conference. They solicited Gerald Ford of Michigan as the challenger. Ford agreed and won the ballot, becoming the new Chairman.

It was Lyndon B. Johnson's landslide defeat of Barry Goldwater in the 1964 Presidential election, coupled with heavy losses in the House, that mobilized all the key players to further action. The Young Turks questioned the Republican Party's viability and wanted to change the direction of the Republican Party. 
Donald Rumsfeld, another member of the group, later wrote about how dire it was, "Republicans in the U.S. House of Representatives were reduced to a low of 140 of the 435 Members of Congress. There were so many Democrats that some had to sit in the Republican side of the [a]isle."

The Young Turks decided it was time to take control and replace the top Republican leadership in Congress.  They picked Gerald Ford over their other option, Melvin Laird (Wisconsin), to oust the presiding House Minority Leader, Charles Halleck. Their choice of Ford, and his subsequent win, set the stage for Ford to later be tapped as Vice President, and then President by succession.

Members
According to New York, members included:
Thomas B. Curtis
Representative from Missouri, January 3, 1951 – January 3, 1969
Robert Ellsworth
Representative from Kansas, January 3, 1961 – January 3, 1967
Deputy Secretary of Defense, December 1975 – January 1977 (under Ford)
Gerald Ford
Representative from Michigan, January 3, 1949 – December 6, 1973
House Minority Leader, January 3, 1965 – December 6, 1973
Vice President, December 6, 1973 – August 9, 1974 (under Richard Nixon)
President, August 9, 1974 – January 20, 1977
Charles Goodell
Representative from New York, May 26, 1959 – September 9, 1968
Senator from New York, September 10, 1968 – January 3, 1971
Robert P. Griffin
Representative from Michigan, January 3, 1957 – May 11, 1966
Senator from Michigan, May 11, 1966 – January 3, 1979
Melvin Laird
Representative from Wisconsin, January 3, 1953 – January 21, 1969
Secretary of Defense, January 21, 1969 – January 29, 1973 (under Nixon)
Al Quie
Representative from Minnesota, February 18, 1958 – January 3, 1979
Governor of Minnesota, January 4, 1979 – January 3, 1983
Donald Rumsfeld
Representative from Illinois, January 3, 1963 – March 20, 1969
White House Chief of Staff, September 21, 1974 – November 20, 1975 (under Ford)
Secretary of Defense, November 20, 1975 – January 20, 1977 (under Ford)
Secretary of Defense, January 20, 2001 – December 18, 2006 (under George W. Bush)

References

Republican Party
Republican
1963 in American politics
1964 in American politics